Statistical Physics of Particles and Statistical Physics of Fields are a two-volume series of textbooks by Mehran Kardar. Each book is based on a semester-long course taught by Kardar at the Massachusetts Institute of Technology. They cover statistical physics and thermodynamics at the graduate level.

Editions

External links 

 Statistical Mechanics I at MIT OpenCourseWare
 Statistical Mechanics II at MIT OpenCourseWare
 Publisher's website for  Particles
 Publisher's website for Fields

References

2007 non-fiction books
Physics textbooks
Statistical mechanics